In enzymology, a polo kinase is a kinase enzyme i.e. one that catalyzes the chemical reaction

ATP + a protein  ADP + a phosphoprotein

Thus, the two substrates of these enzymes are ATP and protein, whereas their two products are ADP and phosphoprotein.

These enzymes belong to the family of transferases, specifically those transferring a phosphate group to the sidechain oxygen atom of serine or threonine residues in proteins (protein-serine/threonine kinases).

The systematic name of this [polo[-like] kinase] enzyme class is ATP:protein phosphotransferase (spindle-pole-dependent).

Examples and other names in common use include Cdc5, Cdc5p, Plk, PLK, Plk1, Plo1, POLO kinase, polo serine-threonine kinase, polo-like kinase, polo-like kinase 1, serine/threonine-specific Drosophila kinase polo, and STK21.

These enzymes participate in 3 metabolic pathways: cell cycle, cell cycle - yeast, and progesterone-mediated oocyte maturation.

Structural studies

References

 
 "Identification and cloning of a protein kinase-encoding mouse gene, Plk, related to the polo gene of Drosophila" 1993
 
 
 

EC 2.7.11
Enzymes of known structure